Nadeem Aslam FRSL (born 11 July 1966 in Gujranwala, Pakistan) is a British Pakistani novelist. His debut novel, Season of the Rainbirds, won the Betty Trask and the Author's Club First Novel Award. His critically acclaimed second novel Maps for Lost Lovers won Encore Award and Kiriyama Prize; it was shortlisted for International Dublin Literary Award, among others. Colm Tóibín described him as "one of the most exciting and serious British novelists writing now".

His most recent book is The Golden Legend (2017).

Early life
Nadeem Aslam moved with his family to the UK aged 14 when his father, a Communist, fled President Zia's regime. The family settled in Huddersfield, West Yorkshire. He later studied biochemistry at the University of Manchester, but left in his third year to become a writer.

Career
At 13, Aslam published his first short story in Urdu in a Pakistani newspaper.

His 1993 debut novel, Season of the Rainbirds, set in rural Pakistan, won the Betty Trask and the Author's Club First Novel Award. Salman Rushdie described it as 'One of the most impressive first novels of the recent years'.

His next novel, 2004's Maps for Lost Lovers, is set in the midst of an immigrant Pakistani community in an English town in the north. The novel took him more than a decade to complete, and won the Encore Award and Kiriyama Prize. It was long-listed for the Man Booker Prize.

Aslam's third novel, The Wasted Vigil, was published by Alfred A. Knopf in September 2008. It is set in Afghanistan. He traveled to Afghanistan during the writing of the book; but had never visited the country before writing the first draft. On 11 February 2011, it was short-listed for the Warwick Prize for Writing

Aslam's fourth novel is The Blind Man's Garden (2013). It is set in Western Pakistan and Eastern Afghanistan and looks at the War on Terror through the eyes of local, Islamist characters. It contains also a love story loosely based on the traditional Punjabi romance of Heer Ranjha. The Blind Man's Garden was shortlisted for the Ondaatje Prize 2014, which is given by the Royal Society of Literature.

He has mentioned Vasko Popa, Ivan V. Lalić, Czesław Miłosz, Wisława Szymborska, Herman Melville, John Berger, VS Naipaul, Michael Ondaatje, and Bruno Schulz. as the writers that he admires.

His writings have been compared to those by Chinua Achebe, Chimamanda Ngozi Adichie and Kiran Desai. Aslam received an Encore in 2005. He writes his drafts in longhand and prefers extreme isolation when working.

He was made a fellow of the Royal Society of Literature in 2012.

Bibliography
Season of the Rainbirds (1993)
Maps for Lost Lovers (2004)
The Wasted Vigil (2008)
Leila in the Wilderness (short story) published in Granta 112 (2010)
The Blind Man's Garden (2013)
 The Golden Legend (2017)
 Punnu's Jihad (Granta Magazine)

Awards
For Season of the Rainbirds
Betty Trask Award 1994
The Author's Club First Novel Award 1993
The Mail on Sunday/John Llewellyn Rhys Prize (shortlist) 1994
The Whitbread First Novel Award (shortlist) 1994
For Maps for Lost Lovers
The Encore Award 2005
The Kiriyama Pacific Rim Book Prize 2005
British Book Awards Decibel Writer of the Year (shortlist) 2006
International Dublin Literary Award (shortlist) 2006
Man Booker Prize (long-list) 2004 
For The Blind Man's Garden
DSC Prize for South Asian Literature (shortlist) 2014
Ondaatje Prize (shortlist)
For The Golden Legend
Jhalak Prize (shortlist) 2018
For literary achievement
2014 Windham–Campbell Literature Prize (Fiction), valued at $150,000 one of the largest prizes in the world of its kind.

References

External links

Marianne Brace, "Nadeem Aslam: A question of honour", The Independent, 10 June 2004. Interview about Maps for Lost Lovers
Interview about The Wasted Vigil, ''BookBrowse.
M. O'Connor, "Writing Against Terror – Nadeem Aslam", Interview with Three Monkeys Online magazine
Video conference in Barcelona - CCCB
Biography from the Berlin International Literature Festival

1966 births
Living people
People from Gujranwala
20th-century British novelists
21st-century British novelists
British male novelists
20th-century British male writers
20th-century British writers
21st-century British male writers
British writers of Pakistani descent
Exophonic writers
Pakistani novelists
Pakistani emigrants to the United Kingdom
Naturalised citizens of the United Kingdom
Fellows of the Royal Society of Literature